Shahpur Jehanian is a town in Sindh, Pakistan between Daulatpur and Moro on the main N-5 National Highway. It is also the headquarters of a union council of the same name. Its population is approximately 40,000.

Industries
There are two industries in the area:
 Al Noor Sugar Mills 
 Medium Density Firbe Board factory of Lasani boards
Both are associated with Al-Noor Group.

References 

Populated places in Sindh